The National Civil Rights Museum is a complex of museums and historic buildings in Memphis, Tennessee; its exhibits trace the history of the civil rights movement in the United States from the 17th century to the present. The museum is built around the former Lorraine Motel, which was the site of the assassination of Martin Luther King Jr. in 1968; King died at St. Joseph's Hospital. Two other buildings and their adjacent property, also connected with the King assassination, have been acquired as part of the museum complex.

The museum reopened in 2014 after renovations that increased the number of multi-media and interactive exhibits, including numerous short movies to enhance features. The museum is owned and operated by the Lorraine Civil Rights Museum Foundation, based in Memphis. The Lorraine Motel is owned by the Tennessee State Museum and leased long term to the Foundation to operate as part of the museum complex. In 2016, the museum was honored by becoming a Smithsonian Affiliate museum. It is also a contributing property to the South Main Street Historic District of the National Register of Historic Places.

History

The site began as the 16-room Windsorlorrine Hotel around 1925 and was later known as the Marquette Hotel. In 1945, Walter Bailey purchased it and renamed it for his wife Loree and the song "Sweet Lorraine".

During the segregation era, Bailey operated the motel as upscale lodging that catered to a black clientele. He added a second floor, a swimming pool, and drive-up access for more rooms on the south side of the complex. He changed the name from Lorraine Hotel to Lorraine Motel. Among its guests through the 1960s were musicians going to Stax Records, including Ray Charles, Lionel Hampton, Aretha Franklin, Ethel Waters, Otis Redding, the Staple Singers and Wilson Pickett.

Establishing the memorial foundation

In 1984, the group changed the name of their organization to the Lorraine Civil Rights Museum Foundation. The Lorraine finally closed as an SRO motel on March 2, 1988. Sheriff's deputies were needed to evict the last holdout tenant, Jacqueline Smith, in preparation for an $8.8 million overhaul. Lorraine Motel owner Walter Bailey died in July 1988, before getting to see the results of his efforts to establish the museum.

The Foundation worked with Smithsonian Institution curator Benjamin Lawless to develop a design to save historical aspects of the site. The Nashville, Tennessee firm McKissack and McKissack was tapped to design a modern museum on those portions of the grounds that were not directly related to the assassination.

Museum opening in 1991

The museum was dedicated on July 4, 1991, and officially opened to the public on September 28, 1991. D'Army Bailey was the founding president of the museum.

In 1999, the Foundation acquired the Young and Morrow Building, and its associated vacant lot on the West side of Mulberry, as part of the museum complex. A tunnel was built under the lot to connect the building with the motel. The Foundation became the custodian of the police and evidence files associated with the assassination, including the rifle and fatal bullet. The latter are on display in a 12,800 sq. foot exhibit in the former Y & M building, which opened September 28, 2002.

Renegotiation of lease with state in 2007
Through the years, there has been controversy over composition of the board of the museum Foundation and of the mission of the museum, as people have differing opinions. These issues came to a head in December 2007, as the museum foundation was asking the state, which owned the property, to extend its lease for 50 years rent-free.  Bailey, a circuit court judge, said he was disappointed with the museum's emphasis on history. He said that he had envisioned it as an institution to inspire activism. By 2007, members of the board included whites from the corporate world. Bailey and other community activists criticized the board as "too white" and claimed they were shutting out the community. Beverly Robertson, then director of the museum, defended the board and the museum's operation.

Gregory Duckett, a board member, disagreed with Bailey's interpretation, saying the museum was never designed as an activist institution. Robertson noted that many board members were African Americans who had been activists and also entered corporate life. In 2007, the state agreed to a 20-year lease, while taking over major maintenance of the complex. It required the museum board to hold annual public meetings and increase the number of African-American board members.

2012 renovations

The main museum closed in November 2012 for a $27.5 million renovation, to include changes to exhibits and upgrades to building systems. The exhibits were updated for historical accuracy and to add to their evocative power; the work was guided by a group of recognized civil rights scholars. Many of the museum's most popular exhibits did not change, such as Room 306 (where King was staying when he died), the replica sanitation truck (King came to Memphis to support an AFSCME sanitation workers' strike), and the replica of the bus Rosa Parks rode in Montgomery, Alabama, before initiating the Montgomery bus boycott of 1955–1956. The original bus resides at the Henry Ford Museum in Dearborn, Michigan.

In the 2014 reopening, a major new exhibit featured is a replica of the U.S. Supreme Court room where oral argument was heard in 1954 in the seminal Brown v. Board of Education, in which the Court ruled that segregation in public schools was unconstitutional. This was a major victory for the civil rights movement. The museum has several interactive kiosks where patrons can access audio, images, text and video about the full civil rights movement. Visitors can search for text based on event, location, or theme. Many exhibits now feature "listening stations" where patrons with headphones can hear audio about the exhibit they are seeing; one features the voice of Malcolm X in a debate. More than 40 new short films throughout the museum also enhance the effect of the exhibits.

The renovated museum opened to the public on April 5, 2014. The Associated Press review said, "The powerful, visceral exhibit[s set] the tone for an evocative, newly immersive museum experience that chronicles the history of the civil rights struggle in America." King scholar Clayborne Carson of Stanford University said that the museum's renovations present "the best and most recent scholarship on civil rights available today".

Location and complex

The complex is located at 450 Mulberry Street, with all properties except the Lorraine Motel owned by the Lorraine Civil Rights Museum Foundation. The motel is owned by the State of Tennessee and operated by the Foundation under a 20-year lease with the Tennessee State Museum in Nashville.

The main museum is located on the south edge of downtown Memphis in what is now called the South Main Arts District. It is about six blocks east of the Mississippi River. The main  site includes the museum, the Lorraine Motel, and associated buildings. The museum also owns the Young and Morrow Building at 422 Main Street. This was where James Earl Ray initially confessed (and later recanted) to shooting King. The complex includes Canipe's Amusement Store at 418 Main Street, next to the rooming house where the murder weapon with Ray's fingerprints was found. Included on these grounds is the brushy lot that stood between the rooming house and the motel.

The museum exhibits a number of vehicles of historic value or which are otherwise relevant to the time period.  Vehicles on display include an International Harvester garbage truck in an exhibit on the 1968 Memphis sanitation strike that brought King to Memphis, James Earl Ray's 1966 white Ford Mustang, a 1968 Cadillac and 1959 Dodge parked outside the motel, a re-creation of the burned shell of a Greyhound bus used by Freedom Riders, and a bus representative of the Montgomery bus boycott.

Smith protest

At the end, the Lorraine Motel housed temporary guests and residents as an SRO. The last resident was Jacqueline Smith, who had lived there since 1973 while working for the motel as a housekeeper. When the motel was closed in 1988, Smith was evicted. The neighborhood at the time around the Lorraine Motel was a lower-income, predominantly Black area. The reconstruction of the neighborhood was related to other urban redevelopment projects in the downtown area. and the inclusion of the museum in the arts district. Smith and many others claim that the museum, as well as other components of urban redevelopment and the growth of the historical tourism industry, contributed to the gentrification of the South Main St. area. Smith argues that King would have likely preferred efforts to support struggling communities in Memphis, rather than projects that further uproot and alienate them.

Smith's belongings were piled across the street where she covered them with a tarp and set up camp and continued to live as she maintains her protest vigil.

Smith thought King would have objected to having $27 million spent on a building for him and to evicting motel residents, instead of on investing in policies and programs that would help communities of color and poor communities. Since her vigil began, Smith has spoken to thousands of visitors, attempting to spread King's message and explain her thoughts about the museum. Smith has continued her protest vigil for over 30 years.

See also

 The Witness: From the Balcony of Room 306
 Birmingham Civil Rights Institute
 International Civil Rights Center and Museum site of the Greensboro, North Carolina sit-ins
 National Voting Rights Museum
 The Mountaintop (2009 play)
 Mississippi Civil Rights Museum
 List of memorials to Martin Luther King Jr.
 List of museums in Tennessee
 List of museums focused on African Americans
 Civil rights movement in popular culture

References

External links

 National Civil Rights Museum
 National Civil Rights MuseumInformation
 TN History for Kids article about the museum

African-American history in Memphis, Tennessee
Museums in Memphis, Tennessee
Memorials to Martin Luther King Jr.
History museums in Tennessee
African-American museums in Tennessee
Motels in the United States
Hotels established in 1920
1920 establishments in Tennessee
Assassination of Martin Luther King Jr.
Civil rights movement museums
Assassination sites